The 1977 UK & Ireland Greyhound Racing Year was the 51st year of greyhound racing in the United Kingdom and Ireland.

Roll of honour

Summary
The National Greyhound Racing Club (NGRC) released the annual returns, with totalisator turnover up, at £70,685,971 and attendances up, recorded at 6,685,491 from 5847 meetings.

Balliniska Band, a white and black dog trained by Eddie Moore was voted the Greyhound of the Year after winning the 1977 English Greyhound Derby.

Tracks
The Welsh Rugby Union required extended terracing at the National Stadium, which resulted in Cardiff City Council announcing a revamp of Cardiff Arms Park that did not include greyhound racing. The last Welsh Greyhound Derby was held on 9 July and the last meeting on 30 July. Instant Gambler won the last Derby and Lillyput Queen, owned by Cardiff butcher Malcolm Davies and trained by Freddie Goodman, won the last race to be held at the track. Cardiff City Council had taken less than ten minutes to reject a plan to switch greyhound racing to nearby Maindy Stadium. Only three flapping (unlicensed) independent tracks remained in Wales at Swansea, Bedwellty and Ystrad Mynach. Harry George secretary of Greyhound Company Cardiff failed in a bid for Oxford Stadium following Cardiff's closure and Denis Diffley a London businessman also failed in a 21 year lease bid leaving Oxford close to permanent closure.

Coatbridge reopened and in the East of England a new consortium headed by Tom Stanley and Billy Davis took over Ipswich Stadium.

Walthamstow Stadium's future was put in doubt, Charles Chandler Sr. had died the previous year, which resulted in Charles Chandler Jr. becoming Chairman and Percy Chandler becoming Managing Director. Victor Chandler Jr. had owned 20% stake in the track since 1974 but wanted to sell his share due to the fact that his side of the family was concerned with the bookmaking business. The Greyhound Racing Association (GRA) also held a third share in the track  but had to sell to alleviate their debts in January. Suddenly it became apparent that an interested party could acquire a 52% stake in the track and have the controlling interest, it led to a clambering from major players looking to buy Walthamstow. Corals and Ladbrokes both expressed an interest but the Chandler family rallied round, Charles Jr., Percy and Frances (wife of Charles Sr.) spent over £400,000 to withstand the attempts from Corals and Ladbrokes and buy the track outright. Meanwhile another bookmaking firm Hills discussed the possibility of taking over GRA and its £18.4 million debt.

Competitions
A new competition was created called the Trainers Championship; this involved a series of races during one race meeting, between the top six trainers from the previous year. The selection criteria consisted of the leading open race winning trainers and in the inaugural event at Brough Park there was a tie between Natalie Savva and Geoff De Mulder.

News
The GRA heavily in debt were forced to sell their 23% stake in Coral Leisure to alleviate the debt.

Allied Breweries with their Skol and Britvic labels became major race sponsors. Eastville Stadium staged speedway with the bikes using the actual greyhound circuit to race on, it was then re-laid each time. Crayford staged their first meeting on sand, the cost and difficulty of obtaining the peat being the main reason for the switch to sand. Hurdler Try it Blackie, retired after 46 open race wins and 129 races, trained by Frank Melville he was bought for just 48 guineas at Hackney sales. The black dog had reached the 1975 Grand National final.

Hall Green Racing Manager Jeff Jefcoate left the GRA for Northern Sports and the Ramsgate track also introduced a new race called The Thanet Gold Cup and a new tote system called Digico. Former Manchester United footballer Charlie Mitten was appointed Assistant Racing Manager at White City. Scurry Gold Cup finalist Fiano was killed in a vehicle accident on the way back to the Hook Estate and Kennels after the race.

Trainer John Bassett retired from training for a second time to concentrate on breeding and rearing. John Gibbons persuaded Lewisham council to lease him space where the old New Cross Kennels used to exist. The site which was a mass of rubble was cleared by Gibbons and his team to make way for kennels and a schooling track. Trainer Peter Hawkesley passed away aged only 51.

Ireland
Dunmore Stadium was on the verge of closure due to continuing troubles in Northern Ireland, but was saved when a local consortium stepped in. The group including Jim Delargy and bookmaker Sean Graham acquired a majority shareholding in the Belfast Celtic Football & Athletic Company which also owned Celtic Park greyhounds. Investment at Dunmore was initiated with immediate effect and prize money was doubled and new kennels were built. Their attention was then turned to Celtic Park for the same reason.

The Irish Derby trial stakes which were held all over Ireland, had failed to date to produce an ultimate winner of the Irish Greyhound Derby but in 1977 the Kilkenny trial stakes winner Lindas Champion won the 1977 Irish Greyhound Derby. He had entered the stake for just £5 and duly gained a free entry to the competition by winning the Kilkenny heat.

The McKenna family training empire continued to build after Gay McKenna's daughter Paula married Fraser Black.

Nine tracks in Ireland are closed for five weeks following a strike by staff over pay.

Principal UK races

Totalisator returns

The totalisator returns declared to the licensing authorities for the year 1977 are listed below.

References 

Greyhound racing in the United Kingdom
Greyhound racing in the Republic of Ireland
UK and Ireland Greyhound Racing Year
UK and Ireland Greyhound Racing Year
UK and Ireland Greyhound Racing Year
UK and Ireland Greyhound Racing Year